Sports Mogul Inc. is an American video game developer and publisher with five employees, founded in 1997 by Clay Dreslough. They are the creators of Baseball Mogul, Masters of the Gridiron, Football Mogul and Baseball Mogul Online. They were originally known as Infinite Monkey Systems.

External links 
http://www.gamespot.com/pc/sports/baseballmogul2007/news.html?sid=6157518
http://www.gamershell.com/companies/sports_mogul/374303.html
http://www.sportsmogul.com

 
Video game companies of the United States
Video game companies established in 1997
Video game development companies